Krzysztof Ciwczyk (born 1977) is a Polish poet and actor. He was nominated for European Film Award for Best Actor his role in the Wojaczek film in 2000.

Career
He made his debut in "Czasu Kultury" in 1995. Then he went on to star in several Polish films like "Dzikie dzieci" (1995), "Emil i my" (1999), "Dane dni" (2001), "Wiersze dla palących" (2001), "Fundacji Kultury (1999). He then appeared in 2003 film Ksiazoly Wiosny.

Awards and nominations
1995 - laureate of "Czas Kultury"
1995 - laureate of the Polish National Poetry Competition Jacek Bierezin for the volume of Wild Children
1999 - laureate of the Culture Foundation
2000 -Audience Award in the category of Best Acting Act (Wojaczek, 1999) at the National Film Festival Prowincjonalia
2000 - nominated for the European Film Award for Best Actor (Wojaczek, 1999) by the European Film Academy
2003 - laureate of the Poznań Publication of New Releases
2011 - nomination for theWroclaw Silesius Poetry Awardfor the volumeKoncentrat
2014 - laureate of the Fundacja im.Kościelscy 
2015 - nomination for the Wrocław Silesics Prize "Silesius" for the volume Where To Be Bad
2017 - Gdynia Literary Awardin the essay category for Koło miejsca
2019 - nomination to the Wroclaw Silesius Poetry Award for the volume "Mediany"
2022 - nomination for the Wisława Szymborska Award  for the volume "Krematoria" 
2022 - nomination to the Wroclaw Silesius Poetry Award for the volume "Krematoria"

References

External links

1977 births
Polish male film actors
Polish poets
Living people